Scherpenzeel may refer to:

Scherpenzeel, Gelderland, Dutch municipality and town
Scherpenzeel, Friesland, Dutch village
Ton Scherpenzeel (born 1952), Dutch musician